Daniel Kristo (born June 18, 1990) is an American professional ice hockey forward who is currently playing for Sheffield Steelers in the UK EIHL. Kristo previously played with HK Dukla Michalovce of the Slovak Extraliga.

Playing career
Kristo was drafted by the Montreal Canadiens, 56th overall in the 2008 NHL Entry Draft. He played college hockey with the University of North Dakota in the NCAA Men's Division I WCHA conference. In his senior year, Kristo's outstanding play was rewarded with a selection to the 2012–13 All-WCHA First Team.

On July 2, 2013, Kristo was traded, by the Canadiens, to the New York Rangers for right winger Christian Thomas. On August 19, 2014, the Rangers announced that they had re-signed Kristo, who was a restricted free agent, to a one-year $826,875 contract.

On July 2, 2015, Kristo left the Rangers as a free agent, signing a one-year, two-way contract with the St. Louis Blues. In the 2015–16 season, Kristo was assigned to play with the Blues AHL affiliate, the Chicago Wolves. In playing the entirety of the year with the Wolves, Kristo appeared in 71 games in compiling 25 goals and 48 points. On August 2, 2016, Kristo re-signed with the St. Louis Blues on a one-year, two-way contract.

In the 2016–17 season, his second year with the Wolves, Kristo had 2 assists in 8 games before he was dealt by the Blues to the Pittsburgh Penguins in exchange for defenseman Reid McNeill on November 19, 2016. Remaining in the AHL with the Wilkes-Barre/Scranton Penguins, Kristo added 6 goals and 11 points in 32 games before on February 23, 2017, he was dealt again by the Penguins to the Carolina Hurricanes along with a second round draft pick in exchange for Ron Hainsey. He played out the season with the Hurricanes AHL affiliate, the Charlotte Checkers, contributing with 10 points in 14 games.

With dwindling NHL prospects going forward, Kristo opted to sign his first contract abroad in agreeing to a one-year deal with Latvian based Dinamo Riga of the KHL on June 30, 2017.

After a two-year stint in the Swiss National League with SC Rapperswil-Jona Lakers, Kristo left as a free agent to return to the KHL, agreeing to a one-year deal with Chinese club, HC Kunlun Red Star, on July 29, 2020. Kristo collected 4 goals in 14 contests with Kunlun before leaving to KHL to join German club, Augsburger Panther of the Deutsche Eishockey Liga (DEL) on January 8, 2021.

As a free agent, following completing the season with the Augsburger Panther, Kristo moved to the Czech Republic in agreeing to a one-year contract with Rytíři Kladno of the ELH, on July 14, 2021.

In October 2022, following a spell in Slovakia with HK Dukla Michalovce, Kristo moved to the UK to sign for Elite Ice Hockey League (EIHL) side Sheffield Steelers.

Personal life
Kristo's second cousin Ben Blood was drafted by the Ottawa Senators in the 2007 NHL Entry Draft. He currently plays for Tappara in the Liiga.

Career statistics

Regular season and playoffs

International

Awards and achievements

References

External links
 

1990 births
Living people
American men's ice hockey right wingers
Augsburger Panther players
Brynäs IF players
Charlotte Checkers (2010–) players
Chicago Wolves players
Dinamo Riga players
Hamilton Bulldogs (AHL) players
Hartford Wolf Pack players
HC Kunlun Red Star players
Montreal Canadiens draft picks
Ice hockey players from Minnesota
People from Eden Prairie, Minnesota
North Dakota Fighting Hawks men's ice hockey players
SC Rapperswil-Jona Lakers players
Wilkes-Barre/Scranton Penguins players
AHCA Division I men's ice hockey All-Americans
Rytíři Kladno players
Västerviks IK players
HK Dukla Michalovce players
Sheffield Steelers players
American expatriate ice hockey players in Canada
American expatriate ice hockey players in Latvia
American expatriate ice hockey players in Sweden
American expatriate ice hockey players in Switzerland
American expatriate ice hockey players in China
American expatriate ice hockey players in Germany
American expatriate ice hockey players in the Czech Republic
American expatriate ice hockey players in Slovakia
American expatriate ice hockey players in England